Robert Alexander "Jeep" Swenson Jr. (January 5, 1957 – August 18, 1997) was an American professional wrestler, stuntman and actor.

Career

Wrestling
Swenson wrestled for World Class Championship Wrestling in 1987 and 1988 as Jeep Swenson for manager Gary Hart. He debuted on March 7, 1987, defeating Perry Jackson in a 2-minute challenge match. His main feud was with Bruiser Brody, who was wrestling as the masked "Red River Jack". Brody defeated him at the Parade of Champions 1987 event. According to Swenson, he had the largest biceps in the world at that time (they were recorded in the Guinness Book of World Records). From 1993 to 1994, he wrestled for Global Wrestling Federation in Texas, where he feuded with Ahmed Johnson. 

Swenson returned to wrestling for a match at World Championship Wrestling's Uncensored pay-per-view on March 24, 1996. He performed as a member of the "Alliance to End Hulkamania". He was named The Final Solution, but following complaints from Jewish organizations to the Turner corporate offices, his character was renamed The Ultimate Solution. WCW claimed they were unaware that The Final Solution was the name Adolf Hitler gave to his plan to destroy the Jews. The Alliance consisted of the Dungeon of Doom, the Four Horsemen, The Ultimate Solution and Z-Gangsta, working to end Hulk Hogan's career.

Boxing
Swenson boxed as an amateur middleweight and later had a short career as a professional boxer. He won his first two bouts by knockouts, but his third fight was stopped in round one after he was knocked down twice by Frankie Garcia in his pro debut.

Acting

Swenson's first role was as an uncredited thug in early Jackie Chan movie The Big Brawl. Swenson also appeared as pit fighter "Lugwrench" Perkins in the 1989 Hulk Hogan film No Holds Barred. He also played James Caan's bodyguard Bledsoe in the Damon Wayans and Adam Sandler film Bulletproof, before playing possibly his best known character Bane in the 1997 film Batman & Robin. His actual blood vessels were outlined in ink for “Batman” by the makeup experts at Warner Bros. He was also featured in many magazines and television commercials.

Personal life
Swenson was born in San Antonio, Texas, the son of Patricia Maxine (née Wells) and Robert Alexander Swenson Sr. His nickname, "Jeep", was derived from his dad (a soldier known as "Tank"), whose logic was that every tank needed a Jeep. He was married to Erin Hillsman; the couple had a daughter named Kayleigh.

Death
On August 18, 1997, Swenson died of a heart attack at the UCLA Medical Center at the age of 40. Hulk Hogan, Davey Boy Smith, and James Caan gave eulogies at his funeral. He was an avid user of steroids and started to use them in his early 20s. Because of this, he reportedly could not take a shower properly, put on a shirt, or walk up stairs. His death also shocked George Clooney, Arnold Schwarzenegger, and Uma Thurman, his co-stars in the Batman & Robin film. After the funeral, Swenson was cremated, and his ashes were scattered in an unknown location.

Filmography

Film

Television

See also
 List of premature professional wrestling deaths

References

External links

1957 births
1997 deaths
American male film actors
American male professional wrestlers
American stunt performers
Male actors from San Antonio
Boxers from Texas
Heavyweight boxers
Professional wrestlers from Texas
20th-century American male actors
American male boxers